The Juvenile Classic is a greyhound racing competition held annually at the Kingdom Greyhound Stadium in Tralee, County Kerry, Ireland. 

It was inaugurated in 2007 and therefore is a relatively new event but due to the significant winners prize money on offer (€15,000 in 2016) it stands as a feature event in the Irish racing calendar.  The competition is only open to juveniles.

The 2020 event was cancelled due to COVID-19 and the 2021 event did not produce starting prices because of lockdown restrictions due to COVID-19.

Past winners

Venues & Distances
2007–present (Tralee 525y)

Sponsors
2007–2010 (Mike Cronin Readymix)
2011–2019 (GMHD (Gallivan/Murphy/Hooper/Dolan) Insurances)
2021–present (Greyhound & Petworld)

References

Greyhound racing competitions in Ireland
Sport in County Kerry
Sport in Tralee
Recurring sporting events established in 2007